Michael Allen Doss (born March 24, 1981) is an American former football safety who played in the National Football League (NFL) for six seasons. He played college football for Ohio State University, earned consensus All-American honors, and was a member of the 2002 national championship team. He was drafted in the second round of the 2003 NFL Draft by the Indianapolis Colts, with whom he played four seasons with, including during the team's 2006 Super Bowl season. Doss then spent one season with the Minnesota Vikings and Cincinnati Bengals each before retiring.

Early years
Doss was born in Canton, Ohio.  He attended Canton McKinley High School, and played high school football for the McKinley Bulldogs.  He led the Bulldogs to back-to-back state football championships, as well as a USA Today national championship, as a running back, linebacker, and safety. As a senior, he had 1,454 yards rushing, 22 touchdowns, 111 tackles, and three interceptions and won all-state honors and an All-America honorable mention by USA Today.

College career
Doss attended Ohio State University, where he played for the Ohio State Buckeyes football team from 1999 to 2002.  He started 40 out of 50 career games and was a three-time first-team All-Big Ten selection and a three-time first-team All-America choice by the Sporting News.  He had 331 career tackles, eight interceptions, eight fumbles recovered, and six quarterback sacks. With Doss starting all 14 games as a senior, Doss intercepted a Ken Dorsey pass to give Ohio State the lead in the BCS national championship game.  As a senior, he was the Big Ten Defensive Player of the Year, and a unanimous first-team All-American.

Doss was inducted into the Ohio State University Football Hall of Fame in 2011.

Professional career

Indianapolis Colts
In 2003, the Indianapolis Colts drafted Doss in the second round of the 2003 NFL Draft. In that season, he started 15 games at strong safety, amassing 101 tackles and three interceptions. Doss was released by the Colts after the 2006 season.

Minnesota Vikings
On April 4, 2007 Doss was signed to a one-year contract by the Minnesota Vikings. He played in eight games.

Cincinnati Bengals
Doss was then signed by the Cincinnati Bengals on December 9, 2008 after the team released defensive end Josh Mallard. He was released by the team on April 27, 2009.

NFL statistics

Key
 GP: games played
 COMB: combined tackles
 TOTAL: total tackles
 AST: assisted tackles
 SACK: sacks
 FF: forced fumbles
 FR: fumble recoveries
 FR YDS: fumble return yards 
 INT: interceptions
 IR YDS: interception return yards
 AVG IR: average interception return
 LNG: longest interception return
 TD: interceptions returned for touchdown
 PD: passes defensed

Personal
In 2005, Mike Doss founded The Michael A. Doss Foundation (Make A Difference campaign). MDF was founded to assist in the advancement of education, relief of the underprivileged and underserved youth and the promotion of social welfare by lessening neighborhood tensions, eliminating prejudice and discrimination, and combating community deterioration and juvenile delinquency. More information is available at www.MADifference.org.

In 2010 Doss was named the winner of the Canton Jaycees Distinguished Service Award.  Doss and the Mike Doss Foundation have been responsible for the Make A Difference Youth  Football Camp at Fawcett Stadium.  Approximately 200 children, ages 8–12, have participated annually. Doss also is responsible for the Back to School Block Party for Canton City Schools students. By partnering with local companies and organizations, Doss’ organization has distributed goods with a total value of $20,000.  Doss also continues to provide gifts to local children during the holiday season and serves as a motivational speaker for students in Canton City Schools as requested.

As of 2017, Doss works for Zimmer Biomet as a medical sales representative in Columbus, Ohio
. He is married with three children and has now taken up golf.

References

External links
Official Website
Cincinnati Bengals bio
Indianapolis Colts bio
Minnesota Vikings bio

1981 births
Living people
Players of American football from Canton, Ohio
American football safeties
Ohio State Buckeyes football players
All-American college football players
Indianapolis Colts players
Minnesota Vikings players
Cincinnati Bengals players